The First Christian Church of Ashland (also known as Old Church of Christ Scientist of Ashland; BO-A-89) is a historic church building at 315 17th Street in Ashland, Kentucky. It was built in 1890. The First Christian Church of Ashland moved out in 1913. The building was added to the National Register of Historic Places in 1990.

It was designed by architect Laura Rogers White.

It has also been known as the Old Church of Christ. Scientist, of Ashland.

References

See also
National Register of Historic Places listings in Kentucky

Churches on the National Register of Historic Places in Kentucky
Gothic Revival church buildings in Kentucky
Churches completed in 1890
19th-century churches in the United States
National Register of Historic Places in Boyd County, Kentucky
Churches in Boyd County, Kentucky
1890 establishments in Kentucky